The 20th season of Taniec z gwiazdami, the Polish edition of Dancing With the Stars, started on 3 March 2017. This is the seventh season aired on Polsat. Krzysztof Ibisz and Paulina Sykut-Jeżyna returned as hosts and Beata Tyszkiewicz, Iwona Pavlović, Michał Malitowski and Andrzej Grabowski returned as judges.

On 12 May, Natalia Szroeder and her partner Jan Kliment were crowned the champions.

Couples

Scores

Red numbers indicate the lowest score for each week.
Green numbers indicate the highest score for each week.
 indicates the couple eliminated that week.
 indicates the returning couple that finished in the bottom two or three.
 indicates the couple saved from elimination by immunity.
 indicates the winning couple.
 indicates the runner-up.
 indicates the couple in third place.

Average score chart 
This table only counts for dances scored on a traditional 40-points scale.

Highest and lowest scoring performances 
The best and worst performances in each dance according to the judges' 40-point scale are as follows:

Couples' highest and lowest scoring dances

According to the traditional 40-point scale:

Weekly scores
Unless indicated otherwise, individual judges scores in the charts below (given in parentheses) are listed in this order from left to right: Iwona Pavlović, Andrzej Grabowski, Beata Tyszkiewicz and Michał Malitowski.

Week 1: Season Premiere
Running order

Week 2: Latin Night
Running order

Week 3: TV Night 
Running order

Week 4: The Crazy 80's
Running order

Week 5: My Place on Earth
Running order

Week 6: Circus Night
Running order

Week 7: Disco Polo Night
Running order

Week 8: Dedications Night
Running order

Week 9: Trio Challenge (Semi-final)
Running order

Dance-off

Running order

Week 10: Season Finale
Running order

Other Dances

Dance chart
The celebrities and professional partners danced one of these routines for each corresponding week:
Week 1 (Season Premiere): Cha-cha-cha, Waltz, Jive, Tango
Week 2 (Latin Night): One unlearned dance (introducing Rumba, Samba, Argentine Tango, Salsa)
Week 3 (TV Series' Themes Night): One unlearned dance (introducing Quickstep, Foxtrot, Viennese Waltz)
Week 4 (Crazy 80's Night): One unlearned dance (introducing Contemporary) and Jive Marathon
Week 5 (My Place on Earth): One unlearned dance and dance-offs
Week 6 (Circus Night): One unlearned dance (introducing Paso Doble, Charleston) and Team Dance Freestyle
Week 7 (Disco Polo Night): One unlearned dance and one repeated dance
Week 8 (Dedications Night): One unlearned dance, improvised medley and one repeated dance
Week 9 (Semi-final: Trio Challenge): One unlearned dance (trio dances), one repeated dance and dance-offs
Week 10 (Season Finale): Judges' choice, Musical dance from Mamma Mia and Freestyle

 Highest scoring dance
 Lowest scoring dance
 Performed, but not scored
 Bonus points
 Gained bonus points for winning this dance-off
 Gained no bonus points for losing this dance-off

Call-out order

 This couple came in first place with the judges.
 This couple came in last place with the judges.
 This couple came in last place with the judges and was eliminated.
 This couple was eliminated.
 This couple withdrew from the competition.
 This couple was saved from elimination by immunity.
 This couple won the competition.
 This couple came in second in the competition.
 This couple came in third in the competition.

Guest performances

Rating figures

Notes

References

External links
 

Season 20
2017 Polish television seasons